Hipertensão 2 (also known as Hipertensão 2010) is the second season the Brazilian stunt / dare reality television show Hipertensão, which premiered September 2, 2010, with the season finale airing on October 21, 2010 on the Rede Globo television network.

The show is produced by Endemol Globo and presented by journalist Glenda Kozlowski, who took over hosting duties from Zeca Camargo.

The winner will receive the grand prize of R$500,000, while runner-up and third-place finishers will walk away with R$100,000 and R$50,000 respectively.

Format
The season 2 format is similar to Fear Factor Extreme (FFX) instead of the original "three-stunt, one winner per episode" format used in the first season. Season 2 consists of multiple sets of stunts and a set number of contestants over a period of weeks.

Production

Cast
There were no application process for the series second season. The sixteen contestants were selected from applications received for No Limite Xtream, who was scheduled to air in 2010, but was postponed due to logistical problems.

Filming
Filming took place in Benavidez, 35 km from Buenos Aires, Argentina. Shooting started on Wednesday, August 25, 2010 and run for thirty days, until Friday, September 24, 2010.

Contestants

The cast list was unveiled on Monday, August 23, 2010.

(ages stated at time of contest)

Elimination Chart

Key

Stunt Wins/Losses
 The contestant won the 1st stunt and was immune for the voting.
 The contestant had one of the better performances in the 1st stunt and was therefore exempted from competing in the 2nd stunt.
 The contestant had one of the better performances in the 2nd stunt and was therefore exempted from competing in the 3rd stunt.

Bottom/Elimination
 The contestant was voted into the bottom three by losing the 2nd stunt.
 The contestant was voted into the bottom three by losing the 2nd stunt and was eliminated after losing the 3rd stunt.
 The contestant was voted into the bottom three by the contestant's vote.
 The contestant was voted into the bottom three by the contestant's vote and was eliminated after losing the 3rd stunt.

The Final Positions
 The contestant came in last in the 1st stunt and finished in 4th place.
 The contestant came in last in the 2nd stunt and finished in 3rd place.
 The contestant came in last in the 3rd stunt and finished in 2nd place.
 The contestant came in first in the 3rd stunt and won the competition.

Voting History

Notes

 Note 1: Shortly after survive the third elimination, Toncley voluntarily left the game before new competitions occurring. At the same night, a new male contestant, Toshi, entered the game as his replacement.
 Note 2: Contestants had one minute to decide together whom to give a free ticket to the next episode. They chose Janine, therefore saving her from elimination in episode 3.
 Note 3: Billy was evacuated due to medical reasons. Still, the bottom three contestants had to compete in the third stunt. Since all three contestants passed the stunt, this round's elimination was cancelled.
 Note 4: Shortly after passed the second stunt, Leo was temporarily evacuated due to medical reasons, therefore, he was exempt for the voting.
 Note 5: Contestants had one minute to decide together who to give a free ticket to the next episode. They chose Leo, therefore saving him from elimination in episode 6.
 Note 6: Andressa & Toshi won the first stunt as a team. However, only one of them would win the immunity. Toshi gave up his immunity and gave to Andressa, saving her from elimination in episode 6.
 Note 7: Episode 7 featured a bottom four, instead a bottom three facing the elimination stunt.
 Note 8: Leo & Lorie won the first stunt as a team. However, only one of them would win the immunity. Leo gave up his immunity and gave to Lorie, saving her from elimination in episode 9.
 Note 9: At the House Council, Lorie and Marcos tied with 3 votes each. Lucas, as immunity winner, had the casting vote and chose to nominate Lorie.

Key

 The contestant was immune for the voting.
 The contestant was already in the bottom.

References

External links
 Official Site 

Hipertensão
2010 Brazilian television seasons